Sharon Hsu (born 11 November 1981) is a Taiwanese actress and singer of Dutch descent. She has had roles in a number of films and television series. On 22 June 2012, her first EP album Wien's Secret Garden was released.

Personal background
In 2009, Sharon Hsu married Alex Tien En Pei, member of B. A. D., but they divorced in November 2012.

Filmography

TV series

Films

Internet dramas

Discography

EP

Music videos
2003 "Rotary wood" (Faye Wong)
2004 "Bless me" (Z-Chen)
2004 "Love" (Wang Leehom)
2005 "The girl said to me" (Yida Huang)
2005 "Flare" (Jones)
2005 "White pattern" (5566)
2005 "Ask you questions from day to day" (A Wei Chang)
2006 "Heroes of Earth" (Chinese version) (Wang Leehom)
2007 "Touch" (Kelvin Tan)
2008 "Treasure" (Shino Lin)
2008 "Stop point" (Shino Lin)

Advertising endorsements
Watsons (running articles) CF
Taiwan Vodka
Public Welfare Young Club CF
Far East Bank CF
Shanghai Miguan Wedding Dress CF
Venus (graphic)
Toshiba MP3 (flyer)
Pantene Shampoo CF
Farong Construction CF
Unified Instant Noodles (Jay Chou)
Taishin Bank JCB Card CF
Ice Fire Vodka CF
Eclipse Mint CF
Fuji Camera CF
Baleno apparel (flyer)
Daily C Juice
Takashima Foot Massager
Kim Lan Soy Sauce
Live Benefits
Bausch & Lomb
Life Market
Myeongdong International Mdmmd. Makeup (endorsement)
Beauty Fashion Eyelashes (endorsement)
Hand Tour Zhu Xian 2 (dual endorsement with Ivy Shao)
China Mitsubishi Motors (dual endorsement with Dai-Kang Yang)

Magazines
Ray
Vivi
Nong Nong
Elle
Vogue
Beautiful Beauty
Kompodan
Bazaar
GQ
Money
Tokyo Clothes
Orange
With
Mina
Man' style
FHM

References

External links
 
 

Sharon Hsu on Mtime 

1981 births
Living people
Actresses from Taipei
Taiwanese television actresses
Taiwanese female models
Taiwanese film actresses
Taiwanese people of Dutch descent
21st-century Taiwanese singers
21st-century Taiwanese women singers
Aletheia University alumni